Pembroke  is a small community in the Canadian province of Nova Scotia, located in  The Municipality of the District of West Hants in Hants County.

References
Pembroke on Destination Nova Scotia
Mining in Pembroke

Communities in Hants County, Nova Scotia
General Service Areas in Nova Scotia